K37 may refer to:
 K-37 cipher machine; see Otto Buggisch
 , a corvette of the Royal Navy
 Junkers K 37, a German mail plane
 Piano Concerto No. 1 (Mozart), by Wolfgang Amadeus Mozart
 Potassium-37, an isotope of potassium
 Rio Grande class K-37, an American steam locomotive
 Tōfutsu Station, in Hokkaido, Japan